United Nations General Assembly Resolution 65/265 is a resolution of the United Nations General Assembly which suspended the right of Libya to take part in the Human Rights Council. Adopted on March 1, 2011 without vote, the resolution was passed in response to Muammar Gaddafi's treatment of protesters in the 2011 Libyan civil war.

See also
 United Nations Security Council Resolution 1970

References

International reactions to the Arab Spring
65 265
2011 in Libya
First Libyan Civil War
2011 in the United Nations
March 2011 events
Libya and the United Nations